Seems Like Old Times is a 1980 American comedy film starring Chevy Chase, Goldie Hawn, and Charles Grodin, directed by Jay Sandrich and written by Neil Simon. It was the only theatrical film directed by Sandrich, who is best known for his television sitcom directing work.

After Nick Gardenia (Chase) is forced to rob a bank, and becomes a fugitive, he seeks help from his ex-wife Glenda Parks (Hawn), a public defender. Her current husband, Ira Parks (Grodin), is the Los Angeles County district attorney, who harbors a jealous disdain towards Nick.

The film was the second pairing of Goldie Hawn and Chevy Chase, after 1978's Foul Play.

Plot
Nick Gardenia (Chevy Chase), an out-of-luck writer, has the use of a friend's oceanside cabin in Big Sur, California. He is interrupted by a pair of bank robbers who use him to rob a bank in Carmel. Their M.O. is to take an innocent person, force them at gunpoint to rob a bank, and then take the money and toss their captive out of their car. Unfortunately for Nick (in one of Chase's signature pratfalls), he trips in the bank, is helped up and looks directly into a security camera.

The bank's picture of Nick comes to the attention of Los Angeles district attorney Ira Parks (Charles Grodin) when his assistant, Fred (Robert Guillaume), recognizes it to be Parks' wife's ex-husband. Because of his desire to become the state's attorney general, Ira is frustrated and upset, thinking this could harm his campaign.

Ira's wife, Glenda (Goldie Hawn), is a lawyer herself. A public defender, Glenda often tries to rehabilitate her clients by giving them odd jobs around their house, as with her chauffeur/butler Chester (T. K. Carter). After a long day in court, Glenda comes home to mixed news—joy for Ira's run for Attorney General and surprise when Ira gives her the news about Nick. She wants to defend Nick because of her disbelief that he would ever do such a thing.

The robbers ditch Nick and he desperately begins to  make his way to Glenda and Ira's Brentwood home, inadvertently holding up a gas station attendant for candy bars along the way. During a party, Glenda, while searching for one of her dogs, finds Nick hiding in her garage. He begs for help and she tries to get him some food, despite most of the leaders of law enforcement being in her house. Nick explains what happened, but Glenda refuses to help unless he turns himself in. Glenda finally agrees to let him sleep in a guest room over the garage.

The next day Nick decides he wants to go after the guys who did this to him. After some comically close run-ins with the police, Ira, and her feisty maid, Aurora De La Hoya (Yvonne Wilder), Glenda manages to keep anyone from knowing Nick was there. He later robs Glenda of her car but then reappears over her garage, and another confrontation ensues between Ira and Glenda.

Ira soon discovers Nick was telling the truth about the two men who forced him to rob the bank. About to have the governor of California coming to the house for dinner, Glenda must deal with court cases, her maid having foot surgery (which could ruin the party without the governor's favorite dish), and Chester getting drunk in the kitchen. The party takes a hilarious turn when Nick, coming back to turn himself in, ends up serving dinner to the governor, Ira, Glenda, and Fred. The dinner ultimately ends in a fistfight between a jealous Ira and Nick, during which Fred is knocked out.

Nick, Glenda, Ira, Aurora, the dogs and the robbers ultimately end up in the courtroom of Glenda's favorite Judge John Channing (Harold Gould). While the judge is overwhelmed by the happenings in the Parks household, the police bring in the bank robbers. They admit Nick's innocence in exchange for a reduced sentence after getting caught by Aurora and the dogs when they attempted to force her to rob a bank, just like they had done with Nick.

After all is said and done, Nick is free, but he and Glenda still have unresolved feelings. She decides to stay with Ira and kisses Nick good-bye. Some time later, Ira and Glenda decide to take a car trip to forget the recent events. They end up in an accident trying to avoid a cow on the road. Ira breaks his leg, so Glenda has to go for help. She ends up at the only place around: a cabin with all the lights on. Glenda pounds on the door begging for help. The door opens and she discovers the cabin is Nick's.

Cast
 Goldie Hawn as Glenda Gardenia Parks
 Chevy Chase as Nicholas 'Nick' J. Gardenia
 Charles Grodin as Ira J. Parks
 Robert Guillaume as Fred
 Yvonne Wilder as Aurora
 Harold Gould as Judge John Channing
 George Grizzard as Stanley
 T. K. Carter as Chester
 Judd Omen as Warren 'Dex' Dexter
 Marc Alaimo as B. G. Ramone
 Chris Lemmon as Policeman

Reception
Roger Ebert, in a December 24, 1980 review, gave the film two stars out of four and wrote that although it made him "laugh out loud", the movie never "edged over the line of success". He said, "the good parts were good enough to hold out the promise for more. The movie is Neil Simon's attempt at one of those 1940s-style screwball comedies with lots of surprise entrances and hasty exits and people hiding under the bed. It would be hard to improve on the casting (Goldie Hawn, Chevy Chase and Charles Grodin). And there are a couple of really funny, sustained sequences." Gene Siskel of the Chicago Tribune also awarded two stars out of four and called it a "limp comedy" with "only gag lines and no characters." Janet Maslin of The New York Times described the film as "Neil Simon in very funny form" and the cast as "extremely appealing," adding, "The material here is slick and entertaining, and Mr. Sandrich settles for comic simplicity without reaching for anything more. He coaxes the film along at a cheerfully breakneck rhythm."

Charles Champlin of the Los Angeles Times wrote that "if it gets a zero for innovation, it gets somewhere around 93 for the skill with which it delivers an old-fashioned slapstick farce. Like a Henny Youngman routine, it is funny partly because it tries so hard, in a stop-at-nothing-you-take-my-wife-please way, to be funny." Variety wrote that Sandrich "has relied basically upon Neil Simon's script, often funny but thin on development, to carry things. The result is a picture that is amusing on the surface but very typical in terms of its setups ... Of course, none of the pic's drawbacks much matter thanks to the extremely engaging rapport between Chase and Hawn." Jack Kroll of Newsweek wrote that Simon's working on the models of old screwball comedies gave the movie "a breeziness most of his film writing has lacked. On the laugh meter this movie does well. Sandrich has a nice light touch, and his cast is excellent. Especially, of course, Goldie Hawn, the delightful comedienne who provides more pure pleasure than any other movie actress today."

On review aggregator Rotten Tomatoes, 70% of 20 critics' reviews are positive, with an average rating of 6.1/10. Metacritic, which uses a weighted average, assigned the film a score of 58 out of 100, based on nine critics, indicating "mixed or average reviews".

The film was nominated for a Razzie Award for Worst Supporting Actor for Charles Grodin.

Inspiration
According to Turner Classic Movies, Neil Simon was inspired by The Talk of the Town. This 1942 comedy starred Cary Grant as a wrongfully accused man hiding out at the home of a beautiful woman, played by Jean Arthur, with Ronald Colman as the third member of the romantic triangle.

References

External links

 
 
 
 
 
 

1980 films
1980 romantic comedy films
American romantic comedy films
American screwball comedy films
Columbia Pictures films
Films scored by Marvin Hamlisch
Films about bank robbery
Films set in California
Films with screenplays by Neil Simon
1980 directorial debut films
1980s English-language films
Films directed by Jay Sandrich
1980s American films